Okchai are a Muscogee tribe.    They formed part of the former Creek (Muscogee) Confederacy in Alabama, prior to their removal during the 1830s to the Indian Territory.

References

Muscogee
Native American tribes in Alabama
Indigenous peoples of the Southeastern Woodlands